El Momento (English: The Moment) is the second studio album of Jowell y Randy which was released by WY Records. There are 15 tracks which include collaborations with Wisin & Yandel, Plan B, Guelo Star, Yaviah, Franco "El Gorila", De La Ghetto, Cosculluela, Gadiel, and Tico. It was released in Puerto Rico on June 27, 2011, and was released worldwide on July 4, 2011.

This album peaked at no.2 in the billboard top latin albums chart in the week of may 22, 2010.

Track list
"Intro"
"Goodbye"
"Suave y Lento" (feat. Wisin, Tico "El Imigrante" & Franco "El Gorila")
"No Fue Una Noche Normal"
"Un Booty Nuevo" (feat. Yaviah)
"Chica De Novela"
"Dile A Él"
"Amanece (feat. Yandel & Gadiel)
"Loco"
"Hacerlo Así" (feat. Guelo Star)
"Mi Dama De Colombia"
"Solo Por Ti [Remix]" (feat. Cultura Profetica)
"Quien Tiene Mas Flow" (feat. De La Ghetto)
"Su Mama No Sabe Na" (feat. Plan B)
"We From The Bled" (feat. Cosculluela)

Videos
"Loco"
"Un Booty Nuevo" (feat. Yaviah)
"Loco (Remix)" (feat. Wisin & Yandel)
"Mi Dama De Colombia" 
"Goodbye"
"Dile A Él (Salsa Version)" (feat. N'Klabe)
"Mi Dama De Colombia (Remix)" (feat. J-Balvin, Pipe Calderon & Pipe Bueno)
"Solo Por Ti" (feat. Cultura Profetica)

Promotional Songs Non Album 
"Te Siento (Remix)" (feat. Wisin & Yandel)
"Loco (Remix)" (feat. Wisin & Yandel)
"Mi Dama De Colombia (Remix)" (feat. J-Balvin, Pipe Calderon & Pipe Bueno) 
"Dile A El (Salsa Version)" (feat. N'Klave)

References 

Jowell & Randy albums
2010 albums
WY Records albums